The Institute of Applied Sciences Ruhengeri (INES), or simply INES - Ruhengeri, is a private research university located in the Northern province of  Rwanda. It was established on November 17, 2003.

The acceptance rate is around 80-90%, making it one of the most accepting universities in Rwanda.

It is located in the city of Ruhengeri. In 2019, the university started a five year long collaboration with Bingen Technical University of Applied Sciences to research and improve farming practices in the area.

History 
It was founded in 2003 as Université Internationale au Rwanda,  in a ceremony attended by President Paul Kagame.

It was given the power to award degrees in 2010.

In September 2019, it was reported that the university had started a research collaboration with Bingen Technical University of Applied Sciences in the German state of Rhineland-Palatinate. The collaboration is supposed to last 5 years, and has a goal "to improve farming practices through the use of technology".

Faculties and departments

Faculty of Applied Fundamental Sciences
The Faculty of Applied Fundamental Sciences has the following departments:
Department of Civil Engineering
Department of Water Engineering
Department of Architecture
Department of Biotechnologies (Food&Plant options)
Department of Biomedical laboratory Sciences
Department of Land Survey
Department of Computer Science
Department of Land Administration & Management
Department of Statistics Applied to Economy

Faculty of Economics Social Sciences and Management 
The Faculty of Economics Social Sciences and Management has the following departments:

 Department of Enterprises Management
 Department of Applied Economics

Faculty of Education 
Department of French & English education

Faculty of Law

 Department of Law (LLB)

Masters programs 
INES offers the following master programs:
Master's in Microfinance
Master's in Entrepreneurship and SME's Management
Master's in Taxation
Master's in Cooperatives Management

Notable former and current faculty administrators 

 Dancilla Nyirarugero, (Current Governor of Northern Province of Rwanda)

External links 

 Programs
 Website
 Admissions Portal
 E-Learning

References 

Universities in Rwanda